Novoalexandrovsky (masculine), Novoalexandrovskaya (feminine), or Novoalexandrovskoye (neuter) is the name of several rural localities in Russia.

Kaluga Oblast
As of 2010, one rural locality in Kaluga Oblast bears this name:
Novoalexandrovsky, Kaluga Oblast, a khutor in Spas-Demensky District

Rostov Oblast
As of 2010, four rural localities in Rostov Oblast bear this name:
Novoalexandrovsky, Kuybyshevsky District, Rostov Oblast, a khutor in Kuybyshevskoye Rural Settlement of Kuybyshevsky District
Novoalexandrovsky, Matveyevo-Kurgansky District, Rostov Oblast, a khutor in Novonikolayevskoye Rural Settlement of Matveyevo-Kurgansky District
Novoalexandrovsky, Millerovsky District, Rostov Oblast, a khutor in Voloshinskoye Rural Settlement of Millerovsky District
Novoalexandrovsky, Zernogradsky District, Rostov Oblast, a khutor in Gulyay-Borisovskoye Rural Settlement of Zernogradsky District

Stavropol Krai
As of 2010, two rural localities in Stavropol Krai bear this name:
Novoalexandrovsky, Stavropol Krai, a khutor in Alexandriysky Selsoviet of Blagodarnensky District
Novoalexandrovskoye, a selo in Pokoynensky Selsoviet of Budyonnovsky District

Volgograd Oblast
As of 2010, one rural locality in Volgograd Oblast bears this name:
Novoalexandrovsky, Volgograd Oblast, a khutor in Zimnyatsky Selsoviet of Serafimovichsky District